Pirmin Stierli (born 9 October 1947) is a former Swiss football player. During his career he played for FC Zug, FC Zürich, RSC Anderlecht and  Neuchâtel Xamax.

He made 16 appearances for the Switzerland national team between 1968 and 1974.

Honours

Club
FC Zürich
Swiss Super League (4): 1967–68, 1973–74, 1974–75, 1975–76
Swiss Cup (3) 1971–72, 1972–73, 1975–76

References

1947 births
Living people
Swiss men's footballers
Switzerland international footballers
Association football defenders
FC Zürich players
R.S.C. Anderlecht players
Neuchâtel Xamax FCS players
Swiss Super League players
People from Baar, Switzerland
Sportspeople from the canton of Zug